Oblea is a wafer dessert commonly found in Spain and Latin American countries but, dating back from the Middle Ages, has variants across Europe. It consists of two communion wafers sandwiching dulce de leche. While obleas are typically filled with dulce de leche they may also contain jam, cheese, fruits, whipped cream, or a combination of multiple fillings. They are sometimes served with marmalade, condensed milk, chocolate, raspberry sauce, cheese, coconut or other toppings.

It is cooked between two plates (wafer pans), like waffles, or sometimes flattened on an empty reel. In Germany, it is a thin biscuit with a base of unleavened bread with sugar. In Algeria in the 1950s (before independence), street vendors offered wafers from Paris.

It derives from the Old French words oblaye, obleie, wafer (xii), would come from ecclesiastical Low Latin: 'oblata' (hostia) ⇒ "offering, bread offered to the Eucharist", feminine noun noun of "oblatus" ⇒ "offered" esp "offered to God, sacrificed" (see Oblates), used as a past participle of "offe" (from 'ob ferre "to bring before")".

According to other older lexicographers, the term wafer could have its origin in the Greek word 'obelias' (where the term used by Rabelais comes from) which referred to a long and narrow bread cooked on a grill or between two plates and was sold like a grain of sand to be served at the end of the meal and dipped in wine.

The original meaning of the word was that of unleavened bread used in the consecration of the mass, the second meaning, the cookie originally prepared as a host.

References

Colombian cuisine
Spanish cuisine
Mexican cuisine